C. A. Leach & Sons was an Australian bus operator that provided services between Hurstville and Kingsgrove in Sydney, Australia via routes 111 and 194 from 1948 to 1974.

History 
In October 1946, bus route 111 from Ramsgate to Kingsgrove via Hurstville was transferred from H. T. Saint to H. C. (Cliff) Mallam and C. A. (Cec) Leach. In November 1948 the route was acquired outright by C. A. Leach & Sons. In the same month, Leach commenced an alternative route from Hurstville to Kingsgrove, via Hodge Street, operating as route 194.

In May 1952, the section of route 111 between Ramsgate and Hurstville was transferred back to H. T. Saint and incorporated into the existing route 113. The remainder of route 111, between Hurstville and Kingsgrove, continued to operate as an alternative to route 194.

A 1962 timetable provides detail of the route and running times for each of the two routes operated by Leach & Sons.

In November 1974, following the death of Leach, the routes were transferred to Heron Bus Lines, owned by Ken Bradley.

Ownership subsequently passed through Cumberland Bus Company and Allways Bus Service until, in November 1991, routes 111 and 194 were incorporated into a new route 455 that was purchased by Pioneer Coaches in May 1992.

Depot 
C. A. Leach & Sons operated from a depot in Cross Street, Hurstville.

References

External links 
Photographs by Stefan Indyka and Leon Batman of buses operated by C. A. Leach & Sons:
m/o 574 and m/o 4987
m/o 4987
m/o 4517
m/o 708

Bus companies of New South Wales
Bus transport in Sydney
Transport companies established in 1948
Transport companies disestablished in 1974
Defunct bus companies of Australia
Australian companies disestablished in 1974
Australian companies established in 1948